The Katholieke Universiteit Brussel (English: Catholic University of Brussels) was a Flemish university located in Brussels, founded in 1969 as University Faculties St Aloysius (UFSAL), in many ways the equivalent of a liberal arts college. It split up from the primarily French-speaking Saint-Louis University, Brussels to become an independent Dutch-speaking institution. It became recognised as a university by the Flemish Community of Belgium in the early 1990s. It only ever awarded basic undergraduate degrees, which in the older Belgian system of a four-year licenciate meant students had to go on to other universities to complete their courses of study.

In the late 1990s, as a result of politically fuelled doubts about the university's survival, student levels fell drastically, with a knock-on effect on government funding. In 2007 the university merged with a number of other tertiary institutions in Brussels (see Hogeschool-Universiteit Brussel (HUB, European University College Brussels)), and then had a separate existence only as a legal fiction for accreditation and funding purposes.

In 2013, the academic degrees of the KUB were integrated in the Catholic University of Leuven.

See also
 List of split up universities

External links
 More information about higher education in Flanders/Belgium (in English)
 Find an officially recognised programme of this institution in the Higher Education Register

Catholic universities and colleges in Belgium
Universities and colleges in Brussels
Educational institutions established in 1969
1969 establishments in Belgium